USS Inflict may refer to the following ships of the United States Navy:

 , was launched 16 January 1944 and transferred to the Maritime Commission on 8 October 1948
 , was launched 16 October 1953 and sold for scrap in December 1992

United States Navy ship names